Hotel ICON is the teaching and research hotel built for the School of Hotel and Tourism Management by the Hong Kong Polytechnic University. It is fully owned by the university.

Located at 17 Science Museum Road, Tsim Sha Tsui East, Kowloon, Hong Kong, the hotel was built on the site of what was formerly PolyU's staff quarters, Pak Sui Yuen. The new complex retains the original function of staff quarters, and adds new functions such as hotel rooms, a teaching complex and function rooms. The building's topping-up ceremony was held on 11 March 2010, and the hotel was officially opened on 21 September 2011.

Design
The hotel's architectural design was performed by Hong Kong-based Rocco Design Architects Ltd., which was awarded the 2011 Hong Kong Institute of Architects Medal of the Year of Hong Kong for this work. Hong Kong's CL3 Architects designed the interiors, including the guestrooms, the Silverbox ballroom and the lobby's grand staircase. Vivienne Tam, a Hong Kong Polytechnic University graduate, designed ICON's Designer Suite by Vivienne Tam, an 80m2 suite located on the 27th floor. Hong Kong designer Barney Cheng fashioned the staff uniforms. The hotel's logo was created by graphic designer Tommy Li, also a graduate of Hong Kong Polytechnic University.

Conran & Partners designed Hotel Icon's restaurants. French botanist and artist Patrick Blanc created and installed the 18-meter, 230m2 green wall in the Hotel Icon lobby.

Hong Kong designer Freeman Lau curated the hotel's collection. At the time of its opening, Hotel Icon was housing works of art by Asian artists, including Cheung Yee, Kan Tai-Keung, Nancy Chu Woo, Hung Keung, Pauline Lam, William Furniss, John Fung, Chow Chun Fai, Tsang Chui Mei and Terence Lee.

Facilities
Hotel Icon has 262 guestrooms, ranging in size from 36 to 80m2. They include 165 Rooms, 68 Above & Beyond Club Rooms, 26 Suites and 3 Prototype rooms. Apart from the guestrooms, there is a ballroom and convention centre, three restaurants, event and exhibition space as well as a health club and fitness centre.

The three restaurants are:
 Above & Beyond, located on the top floor of the hotel. It serves Cantonese cuisine.
 The Market, located on the second floor. The open-plan restaurant features open kitchens and can accommodate up to 160 diners. 
 GREEN, a casual brasserie and bar situated on the lobby level.

Teaching hotel
The hotel is operating under the mandate to benefit the hotel industry through experimentation and research and offer training to SHTM students. Students have the opportunity to participate in structured internship programs. The school occupies nine floors, of which four floors connect to the hotel.

Awards
 2013 UNWTO Ulysses Award for Innovation in Enterprises

See also
 Hyatt Regency Hong Kong, Sha Tin, a hotel connected to the Chinese University of Hong Kong
 Institute for Tourism Studies

References

External links

Official website of Hotel Icon
 
 Hotel Icon, Hong Kong: review, The Telegraph

Hong Kong Polytechnic University
Hotels in Hong Kong
Tsim Sha Tsui East